Malamorenò is a single by Italian pop singer Arisa, released 17 February 2010 by label Warner Music. It is part of the eponymous album Malamorenò.

"Malamorenò" is a Dixieland swing-styled pop song with a 1930s and 1940s-reminiscent melody talking about love, individualism and the end of the world. At the beginning of the song and about halfway through it there are brief shots of a Series 2 Lancia Appia, a nowadays very rare saloon car from the 1950s. The song was generally well received by the media in Italy, who praised its light and catchy melody alongside a more serious message. The song was first performed at the 60th edition of the Festival di Sanremo in 2010. It was a commercial success in Italy, peaking within the top ten at number four and being certified Platinum for downloads exceeding 30,000 copies; it also entered Swiss charts, reaching 61.

Charts

References 

2010 songs
2010 singles
Sanremo Music Festival songs
Arisa songs
Warner Music Group singles
Songs written by Giuseppe Anastasi